Figura may refer to:

 Bella Figura, one act ballet by Jiří Kylián
 Fgura, town in the south of Malta
 Figura etymologica, rhetoric al figure
 Figura Serpentinata, style in painting and sculpture
 Oliva figura, species of sea snail, a marine gastropod mollusk in the family Olividae (olives)
 translation of figure in some languages
Typology, a new testament theory of interpretation of events, people and sacraments of the Hebrew bible as figurative
Figura, a 1938 essay by Erich Auerbach

People 
 Anna Figura (b. 1990), Polish ski mountaineer
 Katarzyna Figura (b. 1962), Polish actress
 Paulina Figura (b. 1991), Polish ski mountaineer